Gegeshidze is a Georgian surname. Notable people with the surname include:

Archil Gegeshidze (born 1956), Georgian politician 
Vladimer Gegeshidze (born 1985), Georgian wrestler

Georgian-language surnames